Acco or ACCO may refer to:

 Acco (moth), a genus of moth
 Acco (Senones), a chief of Gaul, who induced his countrymen to revolt against Julius Caesar in 53 BC
 Acre, Israel (Hebrew: , ʻAkko)
 Acco super bulldozer, the largest bulldozer ever built
 ACCO Brands, an American office product manufacturer
 American Childhood Cancer Organization
 Association of Child Care Officers
 Associate of the Canadian College of Organists

See also

 Siege of Acre (disambiguation)
 Acre (disambiguation)
 Akko (disambiguation)
 Aco (disambiguation)
 Ako (disambiguation)
 Acho (surname)
 Accos